Berlin Bornholmer Straße is a railway station in the Prenzlauer Berg district of Berlin, Germany. It is served by the Berlin S-Bahn and the M13 and 50 lines of the Berlin Straßenbahn.

History

The station opened on 1 October 1935 at the junction of the Nordbahn line from Berlin to Stralsund with the railway line to Szczecin (at that time part of Germany and called Stettin) where the eponymous street named after Bornholm Island crossed the tracks. As Bornholmer Straße station lay right at the border of West and East Berlin, a temporary connection was built on 25 December 1952 as a warning. It was closed on 13 August 1961 with the construction of the Berlin Wall, and the section to Pankow on the middle track was cut and locked with a gate, turning it into one of Berlin's ghost stations, passed by the western S-Bahn trains from Frohnau and Helligensee all the way to the Nord-Süd Tunnel. The eastern parts remained unused at that time, and train transport were extended from Schönhauser Allee to Bornholmer Straße, which was opened on 10 December 1961. It was also connected to Hohen Neuendorf from Blankenburg, where it was only a short connection from Hohen Neuendorf to Oranienburg, to provide connections from Oranienburg and Bernau to the East Berlin.

After the German reunification, Bornholmer Straße was reopened on 22 December 1990; the platforms for the former East Berlin site were opened on 5 August 1991. Since 1 December 1997 the connecting platforms in Bornholmer Straße were reopened.

Though the station was closed the bridge (Bösebrücke) spanning over the tracks was the site of the Bornholmer Straße border crossing between Prenzlauer Berg and the West Berlin borough of Wedding established in 1961. In the evening of 9 November 1989 thousands of East Berliners and GDR citizens assembled at the bridge demanding entry to West Berlin. At 9:20 pm local guards were the first to open a checkpoint and allow people passing through freely to West Berlin, where they were greeted enthusiastically. The event marked the commencement of the fall of the Berlin Wall.

Station layout
The station is spanned by the Bösebrücke. The station building is located on the street level as a rider station at street level. The bungalow building has a pentagonal superstructure and a small tower adorned with the suburban train symbol. The station is located near Baumschulenweg. The train station is close to the city center. Today, the platform systems consist of two island platforms with four tracks, which are in directional operation. The western platform is located near the Szczecin railway near the ring road, in the opposite direction.

East of the S-Bahn track run the tracks of the mainline. There is no platform for the long-distance train in Bornholmer Straße. The facilities built by Richard Brademann reception (reception building and stair access) are now a listed building.

References

External links
Station information 
Bornholmer Straße border crossing 

Bornholmer Strasse station
Bornholmer Strasse station
Buildings and structures in Pankow
Bornholmer Strasse station